Rajpara is a village and former non-salute Rajput princely state on Saurashtra peninsula in Gujarat, western India.

History
The petty princely state, in Gohelwar prant, was ruled by Survaiya Rajput Chieftains. In 1901 it comprised a single village, with a population of 552, yielding 2,150 Rupees state revenue (1903-4, nearly all from land), paying 274 Rupees tribute, to the Gaikwar Baroda State and Junagadh State.

See also
 Rajpara State (Halar)

References

Princely states of Gujarat
Rajput princely states